Notion is the second extended play by Australian singer-songwriter Tash Sultana, released on 23 September 2016, through their own record label, Lonely Lands Records (distributed by Sony Music Australia in Australia, and Mom + Pop elsewhere).

At the ARIA Music Awards of 2017, Notion was nominated for three ARIA Music Awards; Best Independent Release, Breakthrough Artists and Best Blues and Roots Album.

Track listing

Charts

Certifications

Release history

References

2016 EPs
Tash Sultana albums
EPs by Australian artists